Koun Wick (10 November 1917 – 27 December 1999) was a Cambodian statesman and diplomat who served as Minister of Foreign Affairs from 1970 to 1972 and from 1964 to 1965. He was a cousin of former prime minister Chau Sen Cocsal Chhum.

References

1917 births
1999 deaths
20th-century Cambodian politicians 
Cambodian diplomats
Cambodian expatriates in France
Foreign ministers of Cambodia
Khmer Republic